Shoot the Moon Right Between the Eyes (sub-titled Jeffrey Foucault Sings the Songs of John Prine) is an album by American singer/songwriter Jeffrey Foucault, released in 2009. It is a tribute to musician John Prine.

Track listing 
All songs by John Prine unless otherwise noted.
 "The Late John Garfield Blues" - 3:22
 "Billy the Bum" - 4:45
 "He Was in Heaven Before He Died" - 3:22
 "Unwed Fathers" (Prine, Braddock) - 3:49
 "Hello in There" - 4:47
 "One Red Rose" - 3:17
 "Speed of the Sound of Loneliness" - 4:58
 "Far from Me" -  5:55
 "Daddy's Little Pumpkin" - 2:32
 "Mexican Home" - 3:35
 "Storm Windows" -  4:45
 "That's the Way That the World Goes 'Round" - 2:58
 "Clocks and Spoons" -  9:26

Personnel
Jeffrey Foucault - vocals, guitar, baritone guitar, Mellotron
Mark Erelli – electric guitar, lap steel guitar, background vocals
David "Goody" Goodrich – guitar
Eric Heywood – pedal steel guitar
Annelies Howell – background vocals
Peter Mulvey – guitar, lap steel guitar
 Kris Delmhorst - background vocals
Zak Trojano – drums
Production notes:
 Lorne Entress – engineer
 Mike Zirkel – engineer
 Don Heffington – engineer
 Peter Mulvey – engineer
 Justin Pizzoferrato – engineer, mixing
 Alex McCollough – mastering

References

External links
 Official Jeffrey Foucault website
Signature Sounds Recordings
Young/Hunter Management

2009 albums
Jeffrey Foucault albums